Anzême is a commune in the Creuse department in the Nouvelle-Aquitaine region in central France.

Geography

Population

Sights
 The church of St. Pierre, dating from the thirteenth century
 A stone bridge and stone cross, both dating from the fourteenth century
 The hydroelectric dams on the river

See also
Communes of the Creuse department

References

Communes of Creuse